Karen Irene Winey is an American materials scientist and chair of the University of Pennsylvania department of materials science and engineering.

Education 
Winey majored in materials science and engineering for her undergraduate degree (1985) at Cornell University. Winey earned her masters (1989) and PhD (1991) in polymer science and engineering at the University of Massachusetts Amherst, the latter in the laboratory of Edwin L. Thomas. She completed a postdoc under Ronald G. Larson at Bell Labs.

Career 
Winey is a TowerBrook Foundation Faculty Fellow, professor, and department chair in materials science and engineering at the University of Pennsylvania, where she has taught since 1992. She has mentored students as part of the Research and Education in Active Technologies for the Human Habitat program in collaboration with the Grenoble Innovation for Advanced New Technologies. In 2020, Winey won the Braskem Award for Excellence in Materials Engineering and Science for her work in nanocomposites and ion-containing polymers. She has been a Penn Engineering Wellness Ambassador.

Winey is known internationally for her work using X-ray scattering to characterize polymers, including a recent collaboration with the University of Konstanz. Her lab also focuses on solid polymer electrolyte materials (with such applications as batteries) to replace materials like Nafion. Winey has described Nafion as "something of a fluke. Its structure has been the subject of debate for decades, and will likely never be fully understood or controlled." Winey's group uses scattering and imaging techniques to characterize nanoscale morphologies of polymers and relate them to their ion transport properties.

Recognition
In 2003, Winey was named a Fellow of the American Physical Society (APS), after a nomination from the APS Division of Polymer Physics, "for exquisite application of electron microscopy and x-ray scattering to the determination of the microstructure of polymers and to elucidating the role of microdomain geometry on polymer properties". In 2012 she received the National Science Foundation George H. Heilmeier Faculty Award for Excellence in Research.

References 

American materials scientists
American women engineers
University of Massachusetts Amherst College of Engineering alumni
Year of birth missing (living people)
Living people
Cornell University College of Engineering alumni
University of Massachusetts Amherst alumni
University of Pennsylvania faculty
Fellows of the American Physical Society
21st-century American women